Politics of Living is the third studio album by the Irish rock band Kodaline. It was released on 28 September 2018 through labels B-Unique Records and Sony Music UK. It features prominent production collaborations with musicians such as Steve Mac, Stephen Harris, and Jonny Coffer. Five singles were issued from the album: "Brother", "Follow Your Fire", "Shed a Tear", "Worth It", and "Head Held High". Commercially, Politics of Living was a success within Europe. The album peaked at number one on the Irish Albums Chart, becoming Kodaline's third number one album, and at 15 on the UK Albums Chart.

Track listing

Charts

See also
 List of number-one albums of 2018 (Ireland)

References

2018 albums
Kodaline albums
B-Unique Records albums
Sony Music albums
Albums produced by Steve Mac
Soft rock albums by Irish artists